Caiuá is a municipality in the state of São Paulo in Brazil. The elevation is 375 m.

References

Municipalities in São Paulo (state)